John Barry, VC (1 February 1873 – 8 January 1901) born St Mary's parish, Kilkenny, Ireland, was an Irish recipient of the Victoria Cross, the highest and most prestigious award for gallantry in the face of the enemy that can be awarded to British and Commonwealth forces.

Barry was 27 years old, and a private in the 1st Battalion, The Royal Irish Regiment, British Army during the Second Boer War when the following deed took place on 7/8 January 1901 at Monument Hill, South Africa, for which he was (posthumously) awarded the VC:

His VC is on display at the Lord Ashcroft Gallery in the Imperial War Museum, London.

References

Listed in order of publication year 
The Register of the Victoria Cross (1981, 1988 and 1997)

Ireland's VCs  (Dept of Economic Development 1995)
Monuments to Courage (David Harvey, 1999)
Irish Winners of the Victoria Cross (Richard Doherty & David Truesdale, 2000)

External links
Anglo-Boer War.com
Burial location of John Barry "Transvaal"
Location of Victoria Cross "Sold at auction by Dix Noonan Webb"

Irish recipients of the Victoria Cross
Second Boer War recipients of the Victoria Cross
Royal Irish Regiment (1684–1922) soldiers
1873 births
1901 deaths
19th-century Irish people
Irish soldiers in the British Army
British military personnel killed in the Second Boer War
British Army personnel of the Second Boer War
People from Kilkenny (city)
Irish expatriates in South Africa
British Army recipients of the Victoria Cross